Neva is a feminine given name and a surname. It may refer to:

Given name
Neva Abelson (1910–2000), American pediatrician and medical researcher
Neva Boyd (1876–1963), American sociologist
Neva Brasfield (1889–1980), half of the American comedy duo Uncle Cyp and Aunt Sap Brasfield
Neva Carr Glyn (1908–1975), Australian actress
Neva Edwards (born 1931), educator, lay preacher and former civil servant in Dominica
Neva Gerber (1894–1974), American silent film actress
Neva Goodwin (born 1944), American economist
Neva Haites, Australian geneticist
Neva Jane Langley (1933–2012), American beauty pageant queen, Miss America 1953
Neva Morris (1895–2010), American supercentenarian
Neva Patterson (1920–2010), American actress
Neva Pilgrim, American soprano

Surname
Franklin A. Neva (1922–2011), American virologist and physician
Samuel Néva (born 1981), French footballer

See also

Nava (given name), a feminine given name
Nela (name)

Feminine given names